Teen language may refer to:

the speech patterns of teenagers
the Lorhon language of Côte d'Ivoire
the extinct Thiin language of Australia